Abdel Jabbar Dhifallah is a paralympic athlete from Tunisia competing mainly in category F37 javelin events.

Abdel Jabbar has been a part of three Tunisian teams at the Paralympics.  His first games were in 1996 when he competed in the javelin and discus, finishing seventh in the javelin but winning silver in the discus.  He then missed the 2000 games but did compete in javelin in both 2004 where he finished fourth and 2008 where he finished ninth.

References

External links
 

Year of birth missing (living people)
Living people
Tunisian male javelin throwers
Paralympic athletes of Tunisia
Paralympic silver medalists for Tunisia
Paralympic medalists in athletics (track and field)
Athletes (track and field) at the 1996 Summer Paralympics
Athletes (track and field) at the 2004 Summer Paralympics
Athletes (track and field) at the 2008 Summer Paralympics
Medalists at the 1996 Summer Paralympics
20th-century Tunisian people
21st-century Tunisian people